Joachim Schmid is a Berlin-based artist who has worked with found photography since the early 1980s.

Life and career

Schmid studied Visual Communication at Fachhochschule für Gestaltung Schwäbisch Gmünd and Berlin University of the Arts from 1976 to 1981. He began his career as a freelance critic and the publisher of Fotokritik, an iconoclastic and original contribution to West German photography. In the pages of Fotokritik and in his regular articles and lectures for other outlets, Schmid argued articulately and at times vehemently against prevailing, predominantly conservative notions of 'art photography' and in favour of a broad, encompassing critique of photography as a form of cultural practice.

After ceasing publication of Fotokritik in 1987, Schmid focused on his own art production, based primarily on found photography and public image sources. Living near one of the largest flea markets in Berlin, he had already amassed a rich, deep, and varied collection of vernacular photography which formed the raw material for many of his works.

Schmid's use of extended series reflects his concern with photography as an encompassing, culturally dispersed and ubiquitous social and aesthetic discourse that runs throughout the public and private spheres of modern life. Yet the fundamental richness of Schmid's photographic raw material – along with the sardonic wit he so often displays – derails any attempt to read his work as pure anthropology or social science. His artistic preoccupations reflect a close observation of photographic history and a fascination with photographic images themselves in all their alternately bizarre and conventionalized aspects.

Schmid's work has been exhibited internationally and is held in the collections of many major international institutions. In 2007 Photoworks and Steidl published a comprehensive monograph Joachim Schmid Photoworks 1982–2007 on the occasion of his first retrospective exhibition at The Frances Young Tang Teaching Museum and Art Gallery in Saratoga Springs, NY. He has published more than one hundred artist's books, and at the end of 2009, Schmid founded the ABC Artists' Books Cooperative, a group of artists dedicated to self-publishing using print-on-demand technology.

At Rencontres d'Arles in 2011, Schmid was one of five curators (along with Joan Fontcuberta, Martin Parr, Erik Kessels, and Clément Chéroux) to sign his name to the From Here On manifesto, announcing a new age of photography as represented by 36 artists from around the world.

In 2014 the Hillmann Photography Initiative at the Carnegie Museum of Art released a documentary about Schmid's work, Discarded: Joachim Schmid and the Anti-Museum.

Publications

Publications by Schmid
Erste allgemeine Altfotosammlung. Berlin: Edition Fricke and Schmid, 1991. .
Bilder von der Straße. Berlin: Edition Fricke and Schmid, 1994. .
A meeting on Holiday. Amsterdam: NEROC'VGM, 2003. .
Joachim Schmid. Photoworks 1982–2007. Brighton, UK: Photoworks, and Göttingen, Germany: Steidl, 2007. . Edited by Gordon MacDonald and John S. Weber.
Lambe Lambe. Barcelona, and Mexico City: Editorial RM, 2014. .
Ikea Sucks. Self-published, 2015.

Publications about Schmid
Joachim Schmid e le Fotografie Degli Altri. Milan: Johan & Levi, 2012. . By Roberta Valtorta.

Sources
 Andress, Sarah. The Accidental Predator. Art on Paper, Vol. 12, No. 2, S. 34–35, New York, November 2007.
 Durden, Mark. Photography, Anonymity and the Archive: Joachim Schmid. Parachute, No. 109, p. 114-127. Montreal, 2003.
 Edwards, Elizabeth. Joachim Schmid –Belo Horizonte, Praça Rui Barbosa. Photoworks magazine, p. 36-39. Brighton, Spring/Summer 2005.
 Fontcuberta, Joan. Archive Noise. Photoworks magazine, p. 64-69. Brighton, Spring/Summer 2005.
 Gierstberg, Frits. No more photos please!. Perspektief, p. 58–66, Rotterdam 1991.
 MacDonald, Gordon and John S. Weber (2007). Joachim Schmid Photoworks 1982–2007. Photoworks, Brighton, and Steidl, Göttingen. 
 Menegoi, Simone. I am not a photographer. MOUSSE contemporary art magazine, p. 24-27. Milan, September 2007.
 Palmer, Daniel. Photography and Collaboration. From Conceptual Art to Crowdsourcing, p. 143-152, London, 2017
 Ribière, Mireille. Georges Perec/Joachim Schmid: tentative de description d’un projet de livre d’artistes. Cahiers Georges Perec No. 10, S. 227–252, Bordeaux 2010
 Sachsse, Rolf. Joachim Schmid's Archiv. History of Photography, Vol. 24, No. 3, p. 255-261. Oxford, Autumn 2000.
 Vacheron, Joël. Tausend Himmel et principe d’equivalence. Tausend Himmel and the Equivalence Principle. Volume, No. 1, p. 76 – 83, Paris, June 2010.

References

External links

 by Schmid

1955 births
Living people
Photographers from Berlin